This is a list of United Nations Security Council Resolutions 701 to 800 adopted between 31 July 1991 and 8 January 1993.

See also 
 Lists of United Nations Security Council resolutions
 List of United Nations Security Council Resolutions 601 to 700
 List of United Nations Security Council Resolutions 801 to 900

0701